The Dream Master (1966), originally published as a novella titled He Who Shapes, is a science fiction novel by American writer Roger Zelazny. Zelazny's originally intended title for it was The Ides of Octember. It won the 1965 Nebula Award for Best Novella (which it shared with The Saliva Tree by Brian W. Aldiss in a tie).

Plot summary
The Dream Master is set in a future where the forces of overpopulation and technology have created a world where humanity suffocates psychologically beneath its own mass while abiding in relative physical comfort. This is a world ripe for psychotherapeutic innovations, such as the "neuroparticipant therapy" in which the protagonist, Charles Render, specializes. In neuroparticipation, the patient is hooked into a gigantic simulation controlled directly by the analyst's mind; the analyst then works with the patient to construct dreams—nightmares, wish-fulfillment, etc.--that afford insight into the underlying neuroses of the patient, and in some cases the possibility of direct intervention. (For example, a man submerging himself in a fantasy world sees it utterly destroyed at Render's hands, and is thus "cured" of his obsession with it.)

Render, the leader in his field, takes on a patient with an unusual problem. Eileen Shallot aspires to become a neuroparticipant therapist herself, but is somewhat hampered by congenital blindness. Not having experienced visual sensation in the same way as her patients, she would be unable to convincingly construct visual dreams for them; indeed, in a case of eye-envy, her own neurotic desire to see through the eyes of her patients might prevent her from treating them effectively. However, she explains to Render, if a practicing neuroparticipant therapist is willing to work with her, he can expose her to the full range of visual stimuli in a controlled environment, free of her own attachments to the issue, and enable her to pursue her career.

Despite his better sense and the advice of colleagues, Render agrees to go along with the treatment. But as they progress, Eileen's hunger for visual stimulation continues to grow, and she begins to assert her will against Render's, subsuming him into her own dreams.

Other media
In 1981 Zelazny wrote a film outline based on The Dream Master, which was purchased by 20th Century Fox and later developed into the film Dreamscape. Because he wrote the outline but neither the treatment nor script, his name did not appear in the credits. Assertions that he had his name removed from the credits are unfounded.

See also
 Dreams Are Sacred, a short story by Peter Phillips.

References

1966 American novels
Novels by Roger Zelazny
American science fiction novels
Books with cover art by Frank Kelly Freas
Brain–computer interfacing in fiction
Telepresence
Nebula Award for Best Novella-winning works
Ace Books books
Overpopulation fiction
Psychotherapy in fiction
Novels about dreams